Alexander Laktionov (or Aleksandr Laktionov) may refer to:

 Aleksandr Ivanovich Laktionov (1910—1972), Soviet painter
 Aleksandr Laktionov (footballer) (born 1986), Russian football player

See also 
 Laktionov (disambiguation)